Larry Cunningham (13 February 1938 – 28 September 2012) was an Irish country music singer, who was one of the leading figures of the showband scene in the 1960s and 1970s. Cunningham accomplished a series of "firsts" during his career. In 1964, Cunningham broke into the British charts with "Tribute to Jim Reeves", the first time an Irish artist had done such a thing.

Biography
Cunningham grew up in the townland of Clooneen in Mullinalaghta parish, near Granard, County Longford, in a farming family of seven children. After leaving school at 16 he went to England and worked as a carpenter, playing Irish traditional music and gaelic football during his spare time. In 1958 he returned to Ireland. Still working as a carpenter, he soon joined the part-time Gowna-based Grafton Showband, but left it in 1961 to become fully professional as the lead singer of the Mighty Avons, based in Cavan. That band initially specialised in covers of Jim Reeves songs and similar country material.

The band's first taste of fame came when they were supporting Jim Reeves during the Irish leg of his European tour in 1963; when Reeves walked off the stage during a concert in Lifford in protest at the poor condition of the supplied piano, the Avons (as they later became popularly called) took over and entertained the crowd, to much subsequent publicity and acclaim.

In December 1964, Cunningham and the Mighty Avons had a Top-10 hit with the song "Tribute to Jim Reeves", which also entered the British charts (the first time for an Irish artiste), and played on Top of the Pops (also an Irish first), which further boosted their career. Their major hit was "Lovely Leitrim" in September 1965, which stayed at number one in the charts for four weeks. As well as regularly touring Ireland to large crowds, the Avons made many appearances on television, and often played in Britain, the US, and other places.

In late 1969, he left the Mighty Avons and merged with Edenderry band The Fairways to form Larry Cunningham and the Country Blue Boys, leaving Gene Stuart to front the Avons. Cunningham continued having success with his new band, but after his marriage in 1972 he gave up regular touring in favour of occasional concerts and recording. He continued to have top-10 hits until the mid-1970s, and still performed occasionally for the remainder of his life. In recent years, audio and video compilations of his music have been released, as well as a biography.

In February 1972, Cunningham married Beatrice Nannery, who worked for him managing a supermarket which he owned. They had four children and two grandchildren. He died on 28 September 2012, following a long period of illness.

Discography
Cunningham and his bands have released the following recordings:

Singles

Albums

References

External links
 Official website

1938 births
2012 deaths
Disease-related deaths in the Republic of Ireland
Irish country singers
Irish male singers
People from County Longford